Jan Pringle Eliasberg (born January 6, 1954) is an American film, theatre, and television director and writer. Her debut novel, Hannah's War, was published by Little, Brown in 2020 and has sold 50,000 copies to date. Hannah's War has been called "a gripping cat-and-mouse tale of love, war, deception and espionage that you won't be able to put down." Kate Quinn, author of The Alice Network and The Rose Code. The Jewish Book Council stated, "That a novel that deals fluently with physics, espionage, and Jewish tragedy can also become a deeply affecting emotional tale – with a transcendent, redemptive vision of love – is a tribute to its hugely gifted author." Hannah's War was a Finalist for the National Jewish Book Award and has been acquired for film with Eliasberg adapting the novel for the screen and directing. (Publisher's Marketplace).

Life and career

Eliasberg is from New York City where she attended and graduated from The Brearley School. She is the daughter of the late Ann Pringle Harris, a writer for the New York Times and an English Professor at the Fashion Institute of Technology and the late Jay Eliasberg, a retired vice president for research at the Columbia Broadcast Group.

She graduated magna cum laude from Wesleyan University (at the age of 20 in 1974) and earned a Master's degree in directing at Yale School of Drama (1981). Eliasberg also received an MFA in Fiction from the MFA Program for Writers at Warren Wilson.

In 1973, she co-founded Second Stage at Wesleyan, an organization of students dedicated to producing theater and other performances, which may be the country's first solely student-run volunteer theater organization. The Second Stage is renowned for nurturing generations of theatre, film and television stars, including Lin-Manuel Miranda, whose musical "In the Heights" was born and workshopped on Wesleyan's Second Stage.

Chosen by the prestigious American Film Institute's Directing Workshop for Women, Eliasberg began her television directing career in 1986 directing an episode of Cagney & Lacey. Later that year, she was hand-picked by Michael Mann to direct an episode of Miami Vice, becoming the first of only three female directors of that series. She directed two more Miami Vice episodes in 1986 and 1987, including "Forgive Us Our Debts," and "Contempt of Court" starring Stanley Tucci.

She was also the first woman to direct Michael Mann's Crime Story,  as well as Wiseguy. Her other television directing credits include multiple episodes of Bull; Nashville; The Magicians; Blue Bloods; NCIS:Los Angeles; Parenthood; Criminal Minds; 21 Jump Street, Dawson's Creek, Sisters (also a producer and writer), Early Edition and Party of Five, among many other series.

In early 1988, she was hired to direct the teen comedy How I Got into College, but was replaced only five days into filming by Savage Steve Holland. Neither Eliasberg nor Fox officially commented on the firing, though one anonymous Fox executive was quoted as stating that Eliasberg's approach was more sophisticated than what the studio wanted, saying, "She was giving us Thirtysomething and we wanted Laverne & Shirley."  In 1991 she got another opportunity to direct a film: Past Midnight was a low-budget independent film produced by CineTel starring Rutger Hauer; Natasha Richardson; Clancy Brown, and Paul Giamatti.

She has directed such plays as Spring Awakening, Bertolt Brecht's Saint Joan of the Stockyards, Peer Gynt, Hedda Gabler, The Threepenny Opera, the American premiere of Howard Brenton's Sore Throats and The Importance of Being Earnest.

After receiving her MFA in Fiction in 1996, Eliasberg was hired to write, produce, and direct the NBC series, Sisters, starring Sela Ward, Swoosie Kurtz, Patricia Kalember; George Clooney; Ashley Judd and Paul Rudd. She remained on Sisters for all six seasons the series was on the air.

She has written screenplays, all with strong female leads, and often about women who have been erased from history, for Warner Brothers, Universal, Fox and Sony. Her screenplay W.A.S.P. about the Women Air Service Pilots in WWII, was written for Cameron Diaz and Nicole Kidman. Her original screenplay, Mi Corazon, has Jennifer Lopez attached to produce and star.

During her research into the lives of the W.A.S.P. she came upon an article in The New York Times, published on the day America dropped the bomb on Hiroshima. Below the fold, a paragraph read: "The key component that allowed the Allies to develop the atomic bomb was brought to the Allies by a 'female, non-Aryan physicist." Wondering why the name of this mysterious physicist, responsible for perhaps the most important discovery of the 20th Century wasn't emblazoned across every history and science textbook, Eliasberg was determined to discover the name of this woman—Dr. Lise Meitner who, along with her German colleague, Otto Hahn, discovered and named nuclear fission. This became the germ of inspiration for Eliasberg's novel, HANNAH'S WAR.

Personal life
In 1991, Eliasberg married Neil Alan Friedman, a studio executive at Columbia Pictures. They divorced in 2008. They have a daughter, Sariel Hana Friedman. Eliasberg currently lives in New York City where she is adapting her novel, Hannah's War, for the screen, as well as researching her next book.

Directorial work

Television
 Cagney & Lacey
 Jack and Mike
 L.A. Law
 Miami Vice
 Crime Story
 Wiseguy
 Dirty Dancing
 TV 101
 Booker (also writer)
 The Outsiders
 Brewster Place
 WIOU
 Sisters (also writer)
 Early Edition
 Party of Five
 Any Day Now
 Dawson's Creek
 Nash Bridges
 Strong Medicine
 Ghost Whisperer
 Parenthood
 Supernatural
 Criminal Minds
 NCIS: Los Angeles
 Blue Bloods
 In Plain Sight
 Unforgettable
 Reckless
 Nashville
 The Magicians

Films
 Lovers, Partners & Spies (Independent film, 1988)
 Past Midnight (Feature film, 1991) starring Natasha Richardson, Rutger Hauer, Clancy Brown and Paul Giamatti

Theatre
 Autumn Ladies and Their Lover's Lovers Spring Awakening St. Joan of the Stockyards Sore Throats Hedda Gabler Peer Gynt
 A Christmas Tapestry Brecht on Brecht A Lesson from Aloes A History of the American Film Macbeth A Midsummer Night's Dream The Threepenny Opera  Reckless  The Cote D'Azur Triangle The Brides 
 The Importance of Being Earnest Through the Leaves Request for "L"''

References

IMDBPro

External links

1954 births
American television directors
American theatre directors
Women theatre directors
American women film directors
American women television directors
Living people
Writers from New York City
Wesleyan University alumni
American women television writers
Yale School of Drama alumni
Film directors from New York City
21st-century American women writers